Karri Somerville (born 7 April 1999) is an Australian field hockey player.

Personal life
Karri Somerville was born in Kensington, Western Australia. She was a student at All Saint's College in Bull Creek, Western Australia, from where she graduated in 2016.

Somerville is a current scholarship holder at the Western Australian Institute of Sport.

Career

Junior National Team
In 2016, Somerville was a member of the Australian women's junior national team 'The Jillaroos' that won bronze at the 2016 Junior World Cup in Santiago, Chile.

Indoor National Team
Somerville made her debut for the Australian indoor hockey team in 2018, at the Indoor World Cup in Berlin, Germany. At the tournament, Australia finished in 6th place, and Somerville scored once throughout the competition.

Senior National Team
While Somerville has not yet debuted for the Hockeyroos, she is currently a member of the national development squad.

Somerville qualified for the Tokyo 2020 Olympics. She was part of the Hockeyroos Olympics squad. The Hockeyroos lost 1-0 to India in the quarterfinals and therefore were not in medal contention.

References

External links
 
 
 

1999 births
Living people
Australian female field hockey players
Female field hockey defenders
Field hockey players at the 2020 Summer Olympics
Field hockey players at the 2022 Commonwealth Games
Olympic field hockey players of Australia
20th-century Australian women
21st-century Australian women
Commonwealth Games silver medallists for Australia
Commonwealth Games medallists in field hockey
Field hockey players from Perth, Western Australia
Sportswomen from Western Australia
2018 FIH Indoor Hockey World Cup players
Medallists at the 2022 Commonwealth Games